A multirole combat aircraft (MRCA) is a combat aircraft intended to perform different roles in combat. These roles can include air to air combat, air support, 
aerial bombing, reconnaissance, electronic warfare, and suppression of air defenses.

Definition
The term "multirole" was originally reserved for aircraft designed with the aim of using a common airframe for multiple tasks where the same basic airframe is adapted to a number of differing roles. The main motivation for developing multirole aircraft is cost reduction in using a common airframe.

More roles can be added, such as aerial reconnaissance, forward air control, and electronic-warfare aircraft.  Attack missions include the subtypes air interdiction, suppression of enemy air defense (SEAD), and close air support (CAS).

Multirole has also been applied to one aircraft with both major roles, a primary air-to-air combat role, and a secondary role like air-to-surface attack. However, those designed with an emphasis on aerial combat are usually regarded as air superiority fighters and usually deployed solely in that role, even though they are theoretically capable of ground attack. The Eurofighter Typhoon and Dassault Rafale are classified as multirole fighters; however the Typhoon is frequently considered an air superiority fighter due to its higher dogfighting prowess while its built-in strike capability has a lighter bomb load compared to contemporaries like the Rafale, which sacrifices air-to-air ability for a heavier payload.

Swing-role
Some aircraft, like the Saab JAS 39 Gripen, are called swing-role, to emphasize the ability of a quick role change, either at short notice, or even within the same mission. According to the Military Dictionary: "the ability to employ a multi-role aircraft for multiple purposes during the same mission."

According to BAE Systems, "an aircraft that can accomplish both air-to-air and air-to-surface roles on the same mission and swing between these roles instantly offers true flexibility. This reduces cost, increases effectiveness and enhances interoperability with allied air forces".

"[Swing-role] capability also offers considerable cost-of-ownership benefits to operational commanders."

History

Although the term "multirole aircraft" may be relatively novel, certain airframes in history have proven versatile to multiple roles. In particular, the Junkers Ju 88 was renowned in Germany for being a "jack-of-all-trades", capable of performing as a bomber, dive bomber, night fighter, and so on, much as the British de Havilland Mosquito did as a fast bomber/strike aircraft, reconnaissance, and night fighter. The Hawker Hart was also quite 'multirole' in its numerous variants, being designed as a light bomber but serving as an army cooperation aircraft, a two-seat fighter, a fleet spotter, a fighter-bomber (in fact it was probably the first) and a trainer.

The US joint forces F-4 Phantom II built by McDonnell-Douglas also fits the definition of a multi-role aircraft in its various configurations of the basic airframe design. The various F-4 Phantom II configurations were used in air-to-air, fighter bomber, reconnaissance, and suppression of enemy air defenses (SEAD) mission roles to name a few.

The first use of the term was by the multinational European project named Multi-Role Combat Aircraft, which was formed in 1968 to produce an aircraft capable of tactical strike, aerial reconnaissance, air defense, and maritime roles. The design was aimed to replace a multitude of different types in the cooperating air forces. The project produced the Panavia Tornado, which used the same basic design to undertake a variety of roles, the Tornado IDS (Interdictor/Strike) variant and later the Panavia Tornado ADV (Air Defence Variant). By contrast, the F-15 Eagle which was another fighter aircraft of that era was designed for air superiority and interception, with the mantra "not a pound, air to ground", although the F-15C did have a rarely used secondary ground attack capability.  That program eventually evolved into the F-15E Strike Eagle interdictor/strike derivative which retained the air-to-air combat lethality of earlier F-15s.

The newest fighter jet that fits the definition of 'multi-role' is the Lockheed Martin F-35 Lightning II/Joint Strike Fighter, designed to perform stealth-based ground/naval strike, fighter, reconnaissance and electronic warfare roles. Like a modern-day F-4, 3 variants of this aircraft fulfill the various strike and air defense roles among its joint service requirements: the standard variant is intended to eventually replace the F-16 and A-10 in the USAF and other Western air forces, a STOVL version intended to replace the Harrier in US Marine Corps, British Royal Air Force and Royal Navy service, and a carrier variant intended to eventually replace the older F/A-18C/D for the US Navy and other F/A-18 operators. The F-35's design goal can be compared to its larger and more air superiority-focused cousin, the F-22 Raptor.

Aircraft
Below is a list of some current examples.

See also
 Air superiority fighter
 Attack aircraft
 Fighter-bomber
 Interceptor aircraft
 Interdictor
 Lead-in fighter trainer
 Light combat aircraft
 Strike fighter
 Tactical bomber

References

Attack aircraft
Fighter aircraft
Multi-role aircraft